Mekhilta ( IPA /məˈχiltɑ/, "a collection of rules of interpretation"; corresponding to the Mishnaic Hebrew   'measure', 'rule'), is used to denote a compilation of scriptural exegesis in Judaism, attributed to or written by any of several authors. 

The Mekhilta include:
 The Mekhilta of Rabbi Ishmael, on the Book of Exodus
 The Mekhilta of Rabbi Shimon bar Yochai, on the Book of Exodus
 The Mekhilta le-Sefer Devarim, on the Book of Deuteronomy

See also
Midrash halakha, a mekhilta that is seen as binding

Exegesis
 
Sifrei Kodesh